Pierre Yves Giroux (born November 17, 1955) is a Canadian former professional ice hockey left winger.  He was drafted by the Chicago Black Hawks in the fourth round, 61st overall, of the 1975 NHL Amateur Draft.  He played six games in the National Hockey League with the Los Angeles Kings during the 1982–83 season.  He was also drafted by the Quebec Nordiques of the World Hockey Association; however, he never played in that league.

Giroux was born in Hawkesbury, Ontario and raised in Brownsburg, Quebec.

Career statistics

External links

1955 births
Living people
Canadian ice hockey left wingers
Chicago Blackhawks draft picks
Dallas Black Hawks players
Flint Generals (IHL) players
Hull Festivals players
Ice hockey people from Ontario
Ice hockey people from Quebec
Los Angeles Kings players
New Brunswick Hawks players
New Haven Nighthawks players
People from Hawkesbury, Ontario
People from Laurentides
Quebec Nordiques (WHA) draft picks
Sorel Éperviers players